The 8th Politburo Standing Committee of the Communist Party of Vietnam (CPV), formally the 8th Standing Committee of the Political Bureau of the Central Committee of the Communist Party of Vietnam (Vietnamese: Thường vụ Bộ Chính trị Ban Chấp hành Trung ương Đảng Cộng sản Việt Nam Khoá VIII), was elected at the 1st Plenary Session of the 8th Central Committee in the immediate aftermath of the 8th National Congress.

Members

1st Plenary Session (1996–97)

4th Plenary Session (1997–01)

References

Bibliography
 

.8th National Congress
1996 in Vietnam
2001 in Vietnam